Inape parelegans is a species of moth of the family Tortricidae. It is found in Ecuador (Morona-Santiago Province).

The ground colour of the forewings is pale brownish cream mixed with ferruginous. The markings are dark grey with blackish strigulae. The hindwings are cream, tinged yellowish apically.

Etymology
The species name refers to the similarity with Inape elegans plus the Latin adjective para (meaning similar).

References

External links

Moths described in 2009
Fauna of Ecuador
parelegans
Moths of South America
Taxa named by Józef Razowski